The Young Woman of Amajac (Spanish: , pronounced  in Spanish) is a pre-Hispanic sculpture depicting an indigenous woman. The piece is on display at Mexico City's National Museum of Anthropology. It was discovered in January 2021 in the Huasteca region, in eastern Mexico. A replica is slated to replace the Monument to Christopher Columbus along Mexico City's Paseo de la Reforma.

The sculpture is estimated to have been created between 1450 and 1521, during the postclassic period. She appears to wear jewelry, including circular pendants known as "". Her eyes are hollow indicating that they probably had stones in them. At her bare feet, there is a stake that allowed the sculpture to be placed in the ground upright.

Discovery
A group of farmers discovered the sculpture on 1 January 2021 while preparing to till the land in a citrus field in the town of Hidalgo Amajac, in Álamo Municipality, Veracruz. It is not known whom it is supposed to represent. The National Institute of Anthropology and History (INAH) considered it was similar to the Huastec's fertility goddess, but did not dismiss it as being a representation of a member of the elite. It is the first sculpture of its kind to be found near the Tuxpan River.

According to Alejandra Frausto Guerrero, the head of the nation's Secretariat of Culture, the find is significant. Likely representing an important female ruler, it supports the idea of women's participation in the political life of the Huastecs.

Exhibition
The Young Woman of Amajac was presented at the National Museum of Anthropology of Mexico (MNA) for the exhibition  (The Greatness of Mexico). The statue temporarily left the museum as it was sent back to Hidalgo Amajac, where it received a tribute in a cultural festival organized by its inhabitants. There, the sculpture symbolically inaugurated the Recinto Cultural de Hidalgo Amajac (Cultural Precinct of Hidalgo Amajac), where it will be permanently exhibited.

In November 2021, the Secretariat of Culture and the INAH filmed and published a documentary entitled La Joven de Amajac, una mujer entre el naranjal (The Young Woman of Amajac, a Woman Among the Orange Groves).

Replica

It was announced on 12 October 2021 that a replica of The Young Woman of Amajac will replace the Monument to Christopher Columbus along Mexico City's Paseo de la Reforma. The Columbus statue was removed in October 2020 by the local government. It also replaces the proposal to install Tlalli, an Olmec colossal head by Pedro Reyes. Reyes's proposal was not well-received and was canceled by the city in September 2021. The sculpture will cost 7.5 million pesos (approximately 376,000 U.S. dollars).

See also
 Indigenismo in Mexico

References

External links

 
  (in Spanish)

2021 archaeological discoveries
Indigenous peoples in Mexico City
Indigenous sculpture of the Americas
Limestone sculptures
Mesoamerican stone sculpture
Sculptures of women in Mexico